Manon Kahle (born August 10, 1980 in Vermont, USA) is an American actress. She lives and works in Berlin, Germany as an actress, voice-over artist and illustrator.

Kahle earned her BA (Bachelor of Arts) in Theater and French between 1998 and 2002 at Smith College in Northampton, Massachusetts, USA.

Other
Kahle illustrated the German children's book Die Buddy Bären und der schneeweisse Elefant (literally ), written by Klaus Herlitz.

External links  

 Homepage of Manon Kahle
 

1980 births
Living people
American film actresses
American children's book illustrators
Smith College alumni
American expatriate actresses in Germany
21st-century American women